Maresches is a commune in the Nord department in northern France.

History
During World War I the Germans occupied Maresches. Private A S Bullock, in a posthumously published memoir, recalls going over the top to drive them back, describing 'the tremendous artillery bombardment'. He recalls, 'The noise was terrific and the only thing that could be heard above the shells, which were bursting everywhere, was the crackling of the Vickers machine guns.' Bullock notes that this was the fourth time he went over the top. He remembers, perhaps significantly, 'I had the Lewis gun, and the team stayed with me'. He records struggling to carry the 40 lb gun over a barbed wire entanglement at night during a poison gas attack, and having to remove his gas mask to avoid getting left behind. He also reports an incident of bravery and ferocity by one Corporal Wilcox who later received the Victoria Cross.

Heraldry

See also
Communes of the Nord department

References

Communes of Nord (French department)